Salil Acharya (born 3 November 1980) is an Indian actor, VJ, radio jockey and television host. Acharya made his Bollywood debut in Mohit Suri's 2007 film Awarapan. He is also a radio jockey for Radio City 91.1, a film critic for BBC Asian Network and a VJ at B4U. He is currently working for Sony Pictures Networks India where he is the host of WWE Sunday Dhamaal. He visited New Orleans to be a part of WrestleMania 34 and hosted a special program Namaste Wrestlemania which aired on Sony Ten.

Filmography

TV

References

External links
Salil Acharya: Filmography and Profile

21st-century Indian male actors
Indian male film actors
Indian male television actors
Living people
Indian VJs (media personalities)
1980 births
Actors from Mumbai